The Caucasian squirrel (Sciurus anomalus) or Persian squirrel, is a tree squirrel in the genus Sciurus found in temperate broadleaf and mixed forests in south-western Asia.

The species is usually said to have first been described in 1778 by Johann Friedrich Gmelin in the 13th edition of Systema Naturae, and named Sciurus anomalus. However, some authors argue that this work was actually published in 1788, and that the true first description was made by Johann Anton Güldenstädt in 1785.

Description
The color of the upper body fur ranges from greyish brown to pale grey, depending on the subspecies, while that of the underparts is rusty brown to yellowish, and that of the tail, yellow brown to deep red. The claws are relatively short, compared with those of other tree squirrels, and females have either eight or ten teats.

Samuel Griswold Goodrich described the Caucasian squirrel in 1885 as "Its color is grayish-brown above, and yellowish-brown below".

Distribution and habitat
Caucasian squirrels are native to south-western Asia, where they are found from Turkey, and the islands of Gökçeada and Lesbos in the west, Iran in the southeast, and as far as Israel and Jordan in the south. It is one of only two species of the genus Sciurus to be found on Mediterranean islands, and, although Eurasian red squirrels have been recently introduced to some areas, is the only species of Sciurus native to the wider region.

Three subspecies are recognised:

 S. a. anomalus - Turkey and the Caucasus
 S. a. pallescens - Zagros Mountains, from south-eastern Turkey to Iran
 S. a. syriacus - Lebanon, Syria, Israel, and Jordan

Biology and behavior
The squirrels are diurnal, and solitary, although temporary groups may forage where food is plentiful. Their diet includes nuts, seeds, tree shoots, and buds, with the seeds of oak and pine being particularly favored.

They live in trees, where they make their dens, but frequently forage on the ground, and are considered less arboreal than Eurasian red squirrels. Their alarm call is high-pitched, and said to resemble the call of the European green woodpecker, and they mark their territories with urine and dung.

Breeding occurs throughout the year, but is more common in spring or autumn. Litters range from two to seven, with three or four being typical, and the young are fully mature by five or six months of age.

Conservation
A survey in 2008 found that the species remained abundant within Turkey, however declines are noted in population within the Levant region. The guides for a survey in 1993 in Israel stated that they considered the species to be nearly extinct within the area studied. Whilst the Caucasian squirrel is threatened by poaching and deforestation, the declines recorded are not sufficient to qualify them as anything other than "Least Concern" by the International Union for Conservation of Nature. Hunting of the species is banned by the Central Hunting Commission, and the Caucasian squirrel is protected by the Bern Convention and the EU Habitats Directive.

References

External links

Caucasian squirrel
Mammals of Western Asia
Mammals of Azerbaijan
Mammals of Turkey
Caucasian squirrel
Caucasian squirrel
Taxonomy articles created by Polbot